Danielle Deadwyler (born May 3, 1982) is an American actress. She began her career appearing on Atlanta stage, notably the 2009 production of For Colored Girls, and made her screen debut in the 2012 drama film A Cross to Bear. She appeared in the primetime series The Haves and the Have Nots (2015–2017), the series P-Valley (2020), the miniseries Station Eleven (2021–2022), and the miniseries From Scratch (2022).

Deadwyler garnered critical acclaim for starring in the western film The Harder They Fall (2021) and the biopic Till (2022). Her portrayal of Mamie Till in the latter earned her many accolades, garnering the Gotham Independent Film Award for Outstanding Lead Performance and earning BAFTA Award, Critics' Choice Movie Award and Screen Actors Guild Award nominations.

Early life
Deadwyler was born in Atlanta, Georgia and raised in Southwest Atlanta. She is the daughter of a legal secretary and a railroad supervisor and has three siblings. She graduated from Grady High School (now Midtown High School) and then Spelman College, then received a Master's of Arts in American Studies from Columbia University. In 2017, she earned a second master’s degree in creative writing at Ashland University in Ohio.

Career

2009-2020
Deadwyler began her career appearing on stage productions, include Charlotte's Web, The Real Tweenagers of Atlanta, and most notable playing the role of Lady in Yellow in For Colored Girls Who Have Considered Suicide / When the Rainbow Is Enuf at the True Colors Theater in Atlanta in 2009. She received positive reviews for leading performance in Alliance Theatre's The C.A. Lyons Project. She made her film debut playing the leading role of a homeless, alcoholic mother in the 2012 drama A Cross to Bear directed by Tandria Potts . She later acted in a number of short films, then landed roles on television.

In 2015, Deadwyler guest-starred in the second season of BET's drama series Being Mary Jane. Later that year, she joined the cast of Tyler Perry’s series The Haves and the Have Nots, playing antagonist LaQuita "Quita" Maxwell. She left the series during Season 4. Later she had secondary roles in the films Gifted and The Leisure Seeker and appeared in the television series Greenleaf, Atlanta and Watchmen. On Atlanta stage, she appeared in the Pulitzer Prize-winning play Clybourne Park at Aurora Theater, portrayed an actress injured doing Shakespeare in Smart People at True Colors Theater, and played multiple roles in The Temple Bombing at the Alliance Theater. In 2018, she played the title role of Jane Manning James in the period drama film Jane and Emma. She played a leading role and produced the 2019 thriller film The Devil To Pay. The film and her performance received positive reviews from critics. Cath Clarke from The Guardian wrote in her review: "Deadwyler’s soulful performance really grounds The Devil to Pay even as it cranks into revenge-movie mode."

In 2020, Deadwyler was cast in a series regular role in the series Paradise Lost, with Josh Hartnett, Bridget Regan and Barbara Hershey. The series was not renewed for a second season. Also that year, she guest-starred on FBI: Most Wanted and had a recurring role as Yoli in the series P-Valley.

2021—present
In 2021, Deadwyler played the role of Cuffee in the Netflix western film The Harder They Fall. The character was inspired by Cathay Williams. The film and her performance received positive reviews from film critics.
She received NAACP Image Award for Outstanding Supporting Actress in a Motion Picture for her performance and well as number of Best Ensemble awards. Later in 2021, she played Miranda Carroll in the miniseries Station Eleven Also that year, she was in the Netflix miniseries From Scratch, based on Tembi Locke's memoir. She played the role of lead character' older sister, receiving positive reviews.

Deadwyler starred as Mamie Till in the biographical film Till (2022) directed by Chinonye Chukwu. She received positive reviews from critics for her lead performance in the movie. Manohla Dargis in The New York Times: "With fixed intensity and supple quicksilver emotional changes, Deadwyler rises to the occasion as Mamie, delivering a quiet, centralizing performance that works contrapuntally with the story’s heaviness, its profundity and violence." Deadwyler received the National Board of Review Award for Breakthrough Performance (shared with Gabriel LaBelle for The Fabelmans) and the Gotham Independent Film Award for Outstanding Lead Performance for her performance.

Deadwyler will next play the lead role in the sci-fi thriller Parallel directed by Kourosh Ahari, a remake of Lei Zheng's feature of the same name. She will appear in the horror-thriller film I Saw the TV Glow and the action thriller Carry-On for Netflix.

Filmography

Film

Television

Awards and nominations

References

External links

 
 

African-American actresses
Actresses from Atlanta
21st-century American actresses
American television actresses
Columbia Graduate School of Arts and Sciences alumni
Living people
1982 births
21st-century African-American women
21st-century African-American people
20th-century African-American people
20th-century African-American women
Spelman College alumni